A fichu (from the French "thrown over") is a large, square kerchief worn by women to fill in the low neckline of a bodice.

Description 
It originated in the United Kingdom in the 18th century and remained popular there and in France through the 19th with many variations, as well as in the United States. The fichu was generally of linen fabric and was folded diagonally into a triangle and tied, pinned, or tucked into the bodice in front.

A fichu is sometimes used with a brooch to conceal the closure of a décolté neckline. The fichu can thus be fastened in the front, or crossed over the chest. The cross-over fichu sometimes extended all the way to the back. Some models include a large over-the-shoulders back piece.

The fichu found in several traditional cultures resembles a poncho that covers only the shoulders and chest.

Gallery

See also
Pañuelo
Kerchief
Neckerchief
Cravat
1700–1750 in fashion
1750–1795 in fashion

References

Bibliography
Baumgarten, Linda: What Clothes Reveal: The Language of Clothing in Colonial and Federal America, Yale University Press, 2002.  
Cunnington, C. Willett and Phillis Emily Cunnington: Handbook of English Costume in the Eighteenth Century. London: Faber, 1972.
Payne, Blanche: History of Costume from the Ancient Egyptians to the Twentieth Century, Harper & Row, 1965. No ISBN for this edition; ASIN B0006BMNFS
Ribeiro, Aileen: Dress in Eighteenth Century Europe 1715-1789, Yale University Prison, 2002,

External links

Victorian Fashions and Costumes from Harper's Bazar, 1867-1898
18th century women's kerchiefs and fichus
Description from Diderot's Encyclopedie

Neckwear
Shawls and wraps